World Muslimah, also known as Miss World Muslimah (Arabic: ملكة جمال العالم مسلمه; Persian: دوشیزه جهان مسلمان), is an international beauty pageant and awards event for young Muslim women who are judged to have shown dedication, reputation and concern for Islamic values and community development. The event is run as an international charity event by the World Muslimah Foundation (WMF) to benefit relief of Muslim women in food crises, wars, conflicts and natural disasters.

The first World Muslimah Award was held online at 1 August 2011, and the first Grand Final was held 13 September in the same year.

The requirements are designed to be different from those of pageants like Miss World. Contestants are required to demonstrate religious piety, to be positive role models and show a life of Muslim spirituality.

The pageant
The contest was first held in 2011 and was then only open to Indonesians, but it was later opened up to international entrants. Before entering the World Muslim selection, the 20 finalists have to come to Jakarta, Indonesia to participate in a workshop which is divided into two themes.

 Sholeha (pious) and Smart: participants focus on spiritual subjects including Quran memorization, the development of humanitarian intelligence, the challenges of Islam, woman and their future development, and being the best wife and mother in Islam.
 Healthy, Wealthy, and Beauty: participants are briefed about fashion photography, fun walk, public speaking, presentation skills, fashion, beauty, style, and stage performance.

Recitation of Quran, along with performing both compulsory prayers and gaining more knowledge of Islam, are the finalists' daily activities during the duration of the event, even more so outside the event, because finalists are intended to be exemplary models of the ideal Muslimah.

World Muslimah Foundation
The pageant is organized by the World Muslimah Foundation (WMF), a Muslim women's organization found in 2011.

Winning categories 
Winners are announced in the following categories during the event:
 Winner Miss World Muslimah 
 1st Runner-Up World Muslimah
 2nd Runner-Up World Muslimah
 The Best Al Qur'an Recitation
 The Most Talented Muslimah
 The World Netizen Muslimah
 The Most Favorite World Muslimah (online vote)
 The Most Inspiring Video Profile (online vote)

Titleholders

Country/Territory and number of wins

See also 
List of beauty contests

References

External links
The World Muslimah Beauty Official Facebook Page

Islam and women
Recurring events established in 2011
International beauty pageants
2011 establishments in Indonesia
Continental beauty pageants